Jubb al-Uthman  is a Syrian village located in Al-Hamraa Nahiyah in Hama District, Hama.  According to the Syria Central Bureau of Statistics (CBS), Jeb Elothman had a population of 2033 in the 2004 census. During Syria Civil War, Jubb al-Uthman was captured by ISIS, then captured by SAA on 6 February 2018.

References 

Populated places in Hama District